Mantura rustica is a species of Chrysomelidae family.

References

Beetles described in 1767
Alticini
Taxa named by Carl Linnaeus